Herron is a station on the East Busway, located between Polish Hill and Lawrenceville, and near the Strip District, in Pittsburgh. It is accessed via nearby Herron Avenue.

References

Bus stations in Pennsylvania
Martin Luther King Jr. East Busway